"Irresistible You" is a song recorded by American country music artist Ty England.  It was released in August 1996 as the first single from the album Two Ways to Fall.  The song reached #22 on the Billboard Hot Country Singles & Tracks chart.  The song was written by Billy Lawson.

Chart performance

References

1996 singles
1996 songs
Ty England songs
Song recordings produced by Byron Gallimore
Song recordings produced by James Stroud
RCA Records singles